In mathematical logic, an algebraic definition is one that can be given using only equations between terms with free variables.  Inequalities and quantifiers are specifically disallowed.

Saying that a definition is algebraic is a stronger condition than saying it is elementary.

Related
Algebraic sentence
Algebraic theory
Algebraic expression
Algebraic equation

References

Mathematical logic